Sex for fish sometimes referred to as "fish for sex" is a phenomenon in which female fish traders engage in transactional sexual relationships with fishermen to secure their supply of fish, often out of coercion. Sex for fish as a phenomenon is common in many developing countries; however, the bulk cases have been observed in Sub-Saharan Africa's inland fisheries. The most vulnerable victims are economically disadvantaged women, e.g. single or divorced women, as well as widows, residing in or along the shores of inland fisheries.

Several social-economic factors including poverty, cultural practices, and competition among women who are involved in fish trade are often listed as variables fueling the sex for fish practice. There is no conclusive research that shows what promotes sex for fish practice, however, fishermen seem to be taking advantage of stiff competition between the women who trade in fish to demand sexual favours in exchange for the fish. The men or the trader who receives sexual favours would grant preferential sale, and sale at reduced prices to these women.

In the shores of Lake Victoria in Kenya, women have been observed giving out empty polythene bags to the fishermen before they go out fishing at night or early morning, and when the fishermen return, some of the best catch would be set aside for them, stashed in these bags.

Poverty
In Kenya, where sex for fish has been well documented, poverty among the fishing communities has been constantly listed as factors contributing to the practice of sex for fish. Sex for fish practice in Kenya is popularly referred to as the Jaboya system. Jaboya in Luo tribe dialect means customer; due to the transactional involvement of fishermen with women fish traders, the locals coined the term 'Jaboya system' to refer to sex for fish phenomenon. Fishmongers in the lake-side city of Kisumu have sex with fishermen to get stock to sell, in order to make a living. In Kenya's third largest city of Kisumu, Dunga Beach, along the shores of Lake Victoria, young girls have become the new attraction for fishermen, who use their fish catch to bribe and lure them into sex for fish practice fees. The cycle of poverty and vulnerability forces older women to introduce their young daughters or orphaned girls to the sex for fish trade. In return, the young girl has sexual relations with the fisherman that offers the best deal. In many cases, the young girls have sex with multiple partners and are exposed to sexually transmitted diseases, and potentially HIV infections.

Exploitation of gay men
In September 2012, a Kenyan TV station reported incidents where gay men exchange sex for fish. This occurs due to poor catch, or for money. Impoverished gay men have become the latest group to be involved in sex for fish within the fishing communities.

HIV/AIDS prevalence
Some of the earliest recorded cases of HIV/AIDS in Africa were in fishing communities around Lake Victoria in 1982. Several studies have shown a link between sex for fish phenomenon, and higher HIV prevalence.

In Kenya, it is assumed that sex for fish contributes to the high HIV/AIDS prevalence along the lake region, where it is double the national average. Kenya Modes of Transmission Study 2008 had put prevalence in the fishing communities at between 25 percent and 30 percent in Nyanza province in Kenya. The prevalence level of HIV/AIDS infections in Nyanza province is 15.3 percent, which is nearly double the national average. HIV transmission is largely increased, due to the fact that these women have no control over the use of condoms as a preventive measure against the spread of HIV, and other sexually transmitted diseases.

In Uganda, studies conducted around Lake George and Lake Edward by the Uganda Fisheries and Fish Conservation Association (UFFCA), found that the HIV/AIDS prevalence average rate was at 22.4 percent, against the national prevalence of 7.3 percent. Sex for fish is considered by many leaders and researchers as one of the factors that have led to higher than average HIV/AIDS prevalence amongst these fishing communities.

In Mangochi, Malawi, sex is a vibrant part of fishing, and research has shown a strong link between HIV prevalence and the sex for fish trade. Transactional sex is common in Malawian fishing communities, with women identified as vulnerable in negotiations, due to existing gendered power structures. Men carry out the process of catching fish, therefore men control factors of production, while women only control the processing, drying, and selling of the fish. Due to the control of production factors by men, the power dynamics in these exchanges favor men, and make it more difficult for women to negotiate safe sex. The Malawian NGO, Youth Net and Counselling (YONECO) that works to combat the spread of HIV infection in Malawi, observed that despite increased awareness on HIV/AIDS in Malawi, fishermen on Lake Chilwa are queuing for sex. This was disclosed by fishermen who were trained by YONECO as peer educators during a monitoring visit the organization made to Mposa in Machinga district. The reports indicate that a total of 25 fishermen would line up to have sex with one woman, in exchange of 15 dozen fish if no condom is used during sexual intercourse, or 3 dozen fish if a condom is used.

In the Kafue Flats region of Zambia, sex for fish exchange increased the spread of HIV/AIDS rapidly between the years 2002–2005.

Interventions

U.S. Peace Corps
In 2010, two Peace Corps volunteers, Dominik Mucklow and Michael Geilhufe who lived near Lake Victoria decided to do something to help the women who were trapped in sex for fish practice. With support from the U.S. President's Emergency Plan for AIDS Relief (PEPFAR) funding, they assisted a group of women fish traders to acquire their own fishing boats. The women then employed men to go fishing using these boats. This simple advancement allowed women to be free from sexual exploitation in order to secure their fish supply.  No sex for fish aimed to change the work dynamic between the women and the men who make their living from the fishing industry by giving women ownership of the means of production, boats. The women own the boats, as the women work they repay the cost of building the boat, then the boat repayment money is pooled to construct more boats; increasing the number of women involved. The pilot project was managed by the Victoria Institute for Research on Environment and Development (Vired).

Merlin
An organization that brings together local leaders and community members, Merlin has created several theatre groups in Western Kenya that perform skits and plays that deal with the issues that the sex for fish (Jaboya System) practice brings. The shows take place once per month, and coincide with the return of the fishermen to the beach. The shows typically draw large crowds on the beach, and end with a discussion, as well as condom distribution to the fishermen. Local people believe that the shows are getting the local community to change their thinking about the Jaboya system, and ultimately their behaviour as well.

Deadly Catch film
Deadly Catch is a film that was produced by IRIN that centers around the fishing community located outside of Bondo, Kenya. It shows how the HIV virus has affected different people in various ways, focusing on those both directly involved with the jaboya system, and those that have lost family members due to it.

References

External links
 Jaboya vs. Jakambi: Status, Negotiation, and HIV Risks Among Female Migrants in the “Sex for Fish” Economy 

History of fishing
Gender in Africa
Prostitution
Sexual abuse
Fishing in Africa